Zabol Airport  is an airport north-east of Zabol, Iran.

Airlines and destinations

Bus routes
Melli Coach (Zaranj)

References 

Airports in Iran
Transportation in Sistan and Baluchestan Province
Buildings and structures in Sistan and Baluchestan Province